John Brady (born 1 January 1948) is a former Irish Fianna Fáil politician. He was a Teachta Dála (TD) from 1997 to 2007 for the Meath constituency, and then from 2007 to 2011 for the Meath West constituency after the Meath constituency was split into two new ones.

Brady was first elected to Dáil Éireann at the 1997 general election for the Meath constituency and was re-elected at the 2002 general election. He is a former Chairperson of Meath County Council. Brady was re-elected at the 2007 general election for the Meath West constituency.

In February 2011 Brady, who as chairman of the Oireachtas Agriculture Committee received an extra €20,000 on top of his €100,000 annual salary along with €70,000 in expenses, claimed he was "no better off" than when he was a councillor in 1974 on a salary of £6. Fine Gael's Alan Shatter commented: "it is perverse an elected member of the party that got us into this situation should whinge about his €100,000 salary, perhaps a stint in the real world will remind him of the struggles that people are facing".
      
He lost his seat at the 2011 general election.

References

 

1948 births
Living people
Fianna Fáil TDs
20th-century Irish farmers
Local councillors in County Meath
Members of the 28th Dáil
Members of the 29th Dáil
Members of the 30th Dáil
21st-century Irish farmers